"American Skin (41 Shots)" is a song written by Bruce Springsteen, inspired by the police shooting death of Amadou Diallo. It premiered during the band's 1999–2000 reunion tour in concert in Atlanta on June 4, 2000, the final concert before the tour's final ten-show run at New York City's Madison Square Garden, where it was featured again. The performance led to some controversy in New York City, where the Patrolmen's Benevolent Association called for a boycott of Springsteen's shows.

Composition and release 
The song was first released as a live version on the Live in New York City album. The same version appeared a few years later on The Essential Bruce Springsteen. In April 2001, a studio version of the song was released as a very rare U.S.-only one-track radio promotional single on CD-R. A music video featuring the performance from the New York City show was released in 2001 and directed by Jonathan Demme. A studio version appears on Springsteen's 2014 album High Hopes.

Live performances 
"American Skin (41 Shots)" was played at several concerts in April 2012 on the Wrecking Ball Tour in response to the killing of Trayvon Martin. Springsteen performed the song on July 16, 2013, a few days following George Zimmerman's controversial not guilty verdict. It was again dedicated to Martin at the Limerick, Ireland, concert with Springsteen saying before the song "I want to send this one out as a letter back home. For justice for Trayvon Martin".

Springsteen was recognized by the NAACP with the Humanitarian Award on December 3, 2000.

Springsteen played "American Skin (41 Shots)" at selected shows during The River Tour in 2016.

Covers 
Rock band Living Colour performed a cover of "American Skin (41 Shots)" at the Auditorium Stravinski in Montreaux, Switzerland on, July 20, 2001.

In 2016, singer-songwriter Jackson Browne performed a cover of "American Skin (41 Shots)" at Hardly Strictly Bluegrass in San Francisco's Golden Gate Park.

In 2016 Mary J. Blige sang a portion of the song to Hillary Clinton in an interview on Apple Music. The studio version of Blige's cover featured American rapper Kendrick Lamar.

In June 2020, the American band Black Veil Brides released a cover of "American Skin (41 Shots)" in support of Black Lives Matter.

References

External links
 American Skin (41 Shots)  - Lyrics on Bruce Springsteen's site
 "American Skin (41 Shots)" Live in Tampa, FL 03/23/12

2000 songs
Bruce Springsteen songs
Columbia Records singles
Songs about New York City
Songs written by Bruce Springsteen
Song recordings produced by Bruce Springsteen